The Cantamus Girls Choir is a choir based in Mansfield, Nottinghamshire and consists of approximately forty girls aged between thirteen and nineteen. The choir was founded in 1968 by two married couples: Pamela (Director) and Geoffrey Thompson  (Treasurer), and Sheila (Secretary) and Ivan Haslam (Tickets/CD). A Junior Choir was added in 1992 taking girls aged 9, who graduate into the Senior Choir at an appropriate time.

Michael Neaum became the accompanist in 1976 and retired officially in 2006. Ann Irons joined as Assistant Director in 1976. Elaine Guy was a former member and became a Vocal Tutor in 1983. Joy Nicol became a Vocal Tutor in 1995 but died in 2010, aged 45. Philip Robinson was appointed an accompanist in 2006. Notable titles are the Choir of the World title at the 1997 Llangollen Eisteddfod, Olympic Champions title at the World Choir Games in 2004 and 2006, and the Grand Prix award at the Riva de Garda Festival in 1996.

In December 2005, the choir recorded the EMI Album 'Cantamus' one track of which entered the UK Singles Chart with their cover version of "Everybody's Gotta Learn Sometime".

In 2013 Pamela Cook died, and the baton was passed to Ann Irons with Elaine Guy as Assistant. Tributes from former students, associates and friends from all over the globe poured in, recognising her amazing contribution to their lives and to choral music generally. She was due to receive an honorary degree from Nottingham University but died before it could be awarded. This would have added to all her other awards – MBE, Fellowships of both Birmingham Conservatoire and the Royal Academy of Music, and many others. She is to be commemorated in Mansfield with her sculpted head to be displayed in the Palace Theatre and by the commissioning of a special choral work dedicated to her.

Cantamus's major achievements were when the Senior Choir competed at the 4th World Choir Games in Xiamen, China in July 2006, winning two gold medals, and achieved the highest mark of the competition with a score of 89.13. The choir gave its first public concert in 1968 since when more than 400 girls have sung with Cantamus.

Achievements
 1971       –  Montreux International Choral Competition – 2nd prize
 1972       –  Béla Bartók Contemporary Music Festival, Debrecen, Hungary – 1st prize 
 1972       –  BBC Radio 3 "Let the People Sing" – Winners of British Round 
 1978       –  Montreux International Choral Competition – Double 1st prize (Jury & Audience)
 1979       –  Międzyzdroje International Choral Festival, Poland – 1st prize
 1980       –  Llangollen Eisteddfod – 1st prize (Youth Class)
 1982       –  Vienna Youth and Music Festival – 1st prize (Female Choirs Class) 
 1982       –  City of Vienna prize for most outstanding choir in the Festival 
 1986       –  Montreux International Choral Festival – 1st prize (Audience)
 1986       –  BBC/Sainsbury's "Choir of the Year" competition – 1st prize (Adult Section)
 1986–1990  –  Performing Rights Society Awards every year for enterprise
 1994       –  BBC/Sainsbury's "Choir of the Year" competition – 1st prize (Youth Section)
 1995       –  International Choral Festival, Tolosa, Spain – 1st prize (Female Choirs)
 1996       –  Riva del Garda International Choral Competition – Grand Prix
 1997       –  Llangollen International Eisteddfod – Choir of the World
 1998       –  European Youth Music Festival, Neerpelt, Belgium – Summa cum Laude (Main Choir & Training Choir)
 2002       –  Arezzo International Choral Festival: 1st prize (Folk Song Class); 3rd prize (Polyphony Class); 3rd prize (Plainchant Class)
 2004       –  World Choir Olympics, Bremen, Germany: 2 Gold Medals (Equal Voices and Folk Song with Accompaniment Classes); Olympic Champions title
 2006       –  World Choir Olympics, Xiamen, China: 2 Gold Medals (Equal Voices and Folk Song with Accompaniment Classes); Most points awarded in Competition; Olympic Champions title 
 2009       –  "Voyage of Songs" competition in Malaysia – first prizes in three classes plus the Grand Prix. Pamela Cook, director, won the Best Conductor Prize. 
 2010       –  "Heart of Europe" competition held in Gelnausen, Germany: First prize in Sacred Music; second in Contemporary Music class. 
 2013       –  1st European World Games Choral Competition – first prizes in Sacred Music and Youth classes. Third prize in Folk Songs. 
 2013       –  1st European World Games competition in Graz, Austria – first prizes in Sacred Music and Youth classes; third prize in Folk Songs.

Discography
 2001 – Aurora – Warner Music 8573-87312-2

 Aurora
 Summer Song
 Stay a While
 El Viaje (The Journey)
 Astalucia
 Algun otro sitio (Somewhere Other)
 Symphonie Lumiere
 Beautiful Peace (Cudoviti Mir)
 In My Dreams
(tracks 4-9 make up Spanish Suite)

 2005  - Cantamus  (EMI) 0946 3 41017 2 1

	I Still Haven't Found What I'm Looking For	
	Fix You	
	Everybody's Gotta Learn Sometime	
	Universal Song	
	So Deep Is The Night	
	Bridge Over Troubled Water	
	Ave Maria	
	Soul Mining	
	The Rose	
	Over The Rainbow	
	Stay Another Day	
	Serenade	
	Allundé

References

External links
 Official site
 Official Cantamus forum

Musical groups established in 1968
English choirs
Choirs of children
Girls' and women's choirs
Organisations based in Nottinghamshire
Musical groups from Nottinghamshire
Mansfield
1968 establishments in England